Matthew Smith (born 13 March 1997) is a Scottish footballer who plays as a forward for League of Ireland Premier Division side Shelbourne. He started his career with Dundee United and made his first team debut in May 2016, and subsequently had loan periods with Montrose and Cove Rangers before moving to Ireland with Waterford, St Patrick's Athletic and Derry City.

Early life
Matty Smith was born in Dundee on 13 March 1997. He attended Monifieth High School. He played youth football for St Johnstone for seven years, prior to joining Dundee United.

Club career
Smith signed professionally for Dundee United in July 2014. He made his first team debut against Partick Thistle in a Scottish Premiership match on 10 May 2016.

In January 2017, he was sent on loan to Scottish League Two side Montrose until the end of the 2016–17 season. He made his debut for Montrose in a 2-1 victory at home to Cowdenbeath where he was also sent off.

Smith was given a first team chance for Dundee United in July 2017 due to injuries to other forwards. He scored his first goal for the club against Cowdenbeath in the Scottish League Cup, but an injury in training ruled him out of the subsequent Dundee derby and for the next six weeks. His first league goal for United came in a 2–1 defeat at Livingston in February 2018. A 20-yard strike he scored in a 3-1 victory against Queen of the South was voted Dundee United's  goal of the 2017-2018 season at the club's annual awards. On 29 May 2018, it was announced that Smith had signed an extension to his contract at Dundee United until May 2020. The club's manager Csaba László welcomed the news and commented Smith had 'shown he can be an essential player for us.

On 15 August 2019, Smith joined Cove Rangers on loan until January 2020. Smith left Dundee United in January 2020 and signed for Irish club Waterford. In January 2021 he was transferred from Waterford to another Irish club, St Patrick's Athletic, where he would team up with former Dundee United teammate Billy King. He made his debut for the club in the opening game of the season, a 1–1 draw away to Shamrock Rovers in a Dublin derby on 19 March 2021. Smith scored his first goal for the Saints on 23 April 2021, heading home the second goal in a 2–0 win away to Finn Harps at Finn Park. On 8 August 2021, he scored his sixth and seventh goals of the season in a 4–1 win away to Dundalk at Oriel Park. Smith scored in the FAI Cup Semi-final on 22 October 2021 to give his side a 2–1 lead over Dundalk in an eventual 3–1 win to earn a place in the 2021 FAI Cup Final. A week later, on 29 October 2021 he scored his first career hat-trick, scoring a perfect hat-trick in a 4–1 win away to Longford Town as well as assisting the other goal in a win that secured UEFA Europa Conference League football for his club for the following season. On 28 November 2021 Smith was in his sides starting XI in the 2021 FAI Cup Final, as they defeated rivals Bohemians 4–3 on penalties following a 1–1 draw after extra time in front of a record FAI Cup Final crowd of 37,126 at the Aviva Stadium.

On 31 January 2022, Smith signed a 2 year contract with Derry City. He made his career debut in European competition on 7 July 2022 against Riga FC in the UEFA Europa Conference League but was harshly sent off during a 2–0 loss for an altercation with Ngonda Muzinga.

On 28 July he signed for Shelbourne on loan until the end of the season. After 2 goals in 15 appearances in all competitions during his loan spell, on 2 December 2022, it was announced that Smith would be joining Shelbourne on a permanent basis for the 2023 season.

Career statistics

Honours
Cove Rangers
Scottish League Two: 2019–20

St Patrick's Athletic
FAI Cup: 2021

References

External links

Living people
1997 births
Scottish footballers
Association football forwards
Dundee United F.C. players
Montrose F.C. players
Scottish Professional Football League players
League of Ireland players
Footballers from Dundee
People educated at Monifieth High School
Cove Rangers F.C. players
Waterford F.C. players
St Patrick's Athletic F.C. players
Derry City F.C. players
Shelbourne F.C. players
Expatriate association footballers in the Republic of Ireland